The Winston-Salem Cycling Classic is a women's one-day road bicycle race held in the United States. Between 2017 and 2019, it was rated by the UCI as a 1.1 race.

Past winners

Road race

Criterium

References

External links 

Cycle races in the United States
Women's road bicycle races